Created in 1971, Louvain-la-Neuve Science Park is the first of its kind in Belgium and is the largest in Wallonia (the French-speaking part of Belgium). It covers 231 hectares spread over the area of the municipality of Ottignies-Louvain-la-Neuve and the municipality of Mont-Saint-Guibert (30 km away from Brussels). 

From the outset, the objectives pursued by the development of Louvain-la-Neuve Science Park were to develop cooperation between industry and the University of Louvain (UCLouvain) and to contribute to regional economic development. Particular emphasis is placed on environmental-friendliness, as well as the quality of the premises and their surroundings. 

The main areas of activity are: 
 Life sciences
 Fine chemistry
 Information technologies
 Engineering

Louvain-la-Neuve Science Park is now home to more than 135 innovative companies and their 4,500 employees, one business incubator and five business centres.

See also
 Louvain-la-Neuve
 Science Parks of Wallonia
 Université catholique de Louvain (UCLouvain)

External links
 LLN Science Park website
 The Catholic University of Louvain 
 The municipality of Ottignies-Louvain-la-Neuve 

Science parks in Belgium
Buildings and structures in Walloon Brabant
Organizations established in 1971
Mont-Saint-Guibert
Ottignies-Louvain-la-Neuve
1971 establishments in Belgium